UCL Medical School is the medical school of University College London (UCL) and is located in London, United Kingdom. The school provides a wide range of undergraduate and postgraduate medical education programmes and also has a medical education research unit and an education consultancy unit. It is internationally renowned and is currently ranked 7th in the world by the QS World University Rankings 2022.

UCL has offered education in medicine since 1834. The currently configured and titled medical school was established in 2008 following mergers between UCLH Medical School and the medical school of the Middlesex Hospital (in 1987) and the Royal Free Hospital Medical School (in 1998). The school's clinical teaching is primarily conducted at University College Hospital, The Royal Free Hospital and the Whittington Hospital, with other associated teaching hospitals including the Great Ormond Street Hospital, Moorfields Eye Hospital, the National Hospital for Neurology and Neurosurgery and the Royal National Throat, Nose and Ear Hospital, Royal National Orthopaedic Hospital and Luton and Dunstable University Hospital.

History

UCL Medical School formed over a number of years from the merger of a number of institutions:
 The Middlesex Hospital opened in Fitzrovia in 1745 and was training doctors from 1746 onwards, when students were 'walking the wards'.
 University College Hospital opened in 1834 as the North London Hospital, with the purpose of providing the then newly opened University College London with a hospital to train medical students after refusal by the governors of the Middlesex Hospital to share its facilities with UCL.

Middlesex Hospital and University College Hospital merged their medical schools in 1987 to form University College & Middlesex School of Medicine (UCMSM).
 The London School of Medicine for Women was established in 1874 by Sophia Jex-Blake, as the first medical school in Britain to train women. In 1877 The Royal Free Hospital agreed to allow students from LSMW to complete their clinical studies there and by 1896 was renamed The London Royal Free Hospital School of Medicine for Women and became part of the University of London.

In 1998 The Royal Free & University College Medical School (RFUCMS) was formed from the merger of the two medical schools. On 1 October 2008, it was officially renamed UCL Medical School.

In appreciation of the historic beginnings of UCL Medical School, its student society has retained the name "RUMS" (Royal Free, University College and Middlesex Medical Students Society) and runs clubs and societies within University College London Union.

Teaching

The medical school is one of the largest in the country with a yearly intake of 334 students. Undergraduate teaching is spread across three campuses based in Bloomsbury (including University College Hospital), at Archway (including Whittington Hospital) and in Hampstead (including the Royal Free Hospital).

Teaching takes place in: Great Ormond Street Hospital, The National Hospital for Neurology and Neurosurgery (Queen's Square), Moorfields Eye Hospital, The Heart Hospital, The Royal National Orthopaedic Hospital and the Royal National Throat, Nose and Ear Hospital.

The school is not only widely regarded as one of the best medical schools in the country (frequently ranked between number 1–5 in the country), but also one of the best in the world; being ranked consistently in the top 10.

Course
The course in medicine at UCL leads to the award of the MB BS and BSc (Hons) degrees and is a six-year integrated programme: Years 1 and 2 Fundamentals of Clinical Science; Year 3 Integrated BSc degree; Year 4 Integrated Clinical Care; Year 5 The Life Cycle and Specialist Practice and Year 6 Preparation for Practice.

Admission
Admission to the medical school, in common with all 44 medical schools in the UK, is extremely competitive. The medical school receives approximately 2,500 applications yearly (over 2700 for 2018 entry) of which up to 700 applicants are selected for interview. Approximately 450 offers are given for 322 places. Prospective students must apply through the Universities and Colleges Admissions Service (UCAS).

As of 2021 entry, conditional offers for entry include grades A*AA at A-level, to include at least Chemistry and Biology, and an additional subject at A-level. The International Baccalaureate (Full Diploma), although less common, is also an acceptable entry qualification. The course is also open to graduates with a minimum of a 2:1 required. Additionally, applicants must sit an entrance exam, the BioMedical Admissions Test (BMAT) which is used alongside the rest of the UCAS application to determine selection for interview. The interview process involves a 20-30 minute panel interview conducted by a panel of UCL academic staff, members of the healthcare team or medical students.

Associated hospitals and research institutes

Hospitals
UCL Medical School is associated with the following hospitals:
 University College Hospital
 Royal Free Hospital
 Whittington Hospital
 Eastman Dental Hospital
 Great Ormond Street Hospital
 The Heart Hospital
 Moorfields Eye Hospital
 National Hospital for Neurology and Neurosurgery
 Royal National Throat, Nose and Ear Hospital
 Royal National Orthopaedic Hospital

Research institutes
UCL Medical School is associated with the following research institutes:
 UCL Cancer Institute
 UCL Ear Institute
 UCL Eastman Dental Institute
 UCL Institute of Child Health
 UCL Institute of Neurology
 UCL Institute of Nuclear Medicine
 UCL Institute of Ophthalmology
 UCL Institute of Orthopaedics and Musculoskeletal Science
 UCL Wolfson Institute for Biomedical Research at UCL
 National Institute for Medical Research (NIMR)

UCL Medical School forms part of the UCL Faculty of Medical Sciences, together with the Division of Medicine, Division of Infection and Immunity, Division of Surgery and Interventional Science, UCL Cancer Institute, UCL Eastman Dental Institute and UCL Wolfson Institute.

Rankings
In the 2022, QS World University Rankings by Subject UCL was ranked 7th in the world (3rd in Europe, 1st in London) for Medicine.

In the 2022 Academic Ranking of World Universities subject tables, UCL was ranked 16th in the world (and 4th in Europe) for Clinical Medicine.

Student societies
All students at UCL Medical School are also members of The Royal Free, University College and Middlesex Medical Students’ Association (RUMS MSA) - a student-led organisation that is independent of UCL Medical School. RUMS has a proud and illustrious past having been formed in the wake of the merger between the three constituent medical schools in 1998. Its predecessor, The Middlesex Hospital Medical Society is reportedly the oldest student society in England having been formed in 1774. Since its formation in 1998 RUMS (RUMS) has gone from strength to strength and now provides social events, sports teams, societies, welfare services and representation to the 1200 or so medical students at UCL Medical School.

In 2011, UCLU Medical Society was established separate from RUMS MSA to provide careers advice and peer teaching for medical students, as well as special interest events. These events can be centrally organised or by various subdivisions or "sections" within the society ranging from those devoted to medical specialities such as Paediatrics or General Practice to Medical Leadership & Management and Global Health. Since 2012, one of the most popular sections of UCLU Medical Society has been UCLU Med Soc Education, which provides peer-to-peer and near-peer teaching events, run by medical students for other medical students. The novelty of this section is their collaboration with the medical school faculty to ensure quality and validity of the student-produced material and student-led teaching on offer.

Notable alumni

Notable alumni of UCL Medical School and its predecessor institutions include:
 Emmanuel Quaye Archampong, Emeritus Professor of Surgery at the University of Ghana
 Josephine Barnes, championed the cause of women's health throughout her illustrious career. First female president of the British Medical Association in 1979
Herbert Barrie, neonatologist
 Charles Bolton, appointed Commander of the Order of the British Empire (CBE)
 John Bowlby, pioneer of attachment theory
 Michael Brown, former Physician to the Queen
 George Budd, physician after who Budd-Chiari Syndrome is named after
 Walter Carr, physician and surgeon
 G. Marius Clore FRS, Member of the United States National Academy of Sciences, molecular biophysicist and structural biologist known for foundational work in three-dimensional protein and nucleic acid structure determination by multidimensional NMR spectroscopy.
 Archie Cochrane, physician who pioneered randomised controlled studies and after whom The Cochrane Library is named.
 Leslie Collier, virologist who helped to create the first heat stable smallpox vaccine key in the eventual eradication of the disease.
 Mildred Creak, child psychiatrist
 Jane Dacre, former President of the Royal College of Physicians (2014–2018), only the third female President in its nearly 500-year history
 Deborah Doniach, leading expert on auto-immune diseases
 Jeremy Farrar, director of the Wellcome Trust
 Marcus Flather, Clinical Professor in Medicine at the University of East Anglia
 William Henry Flower, comparative anatomist and 2nd director of the Natural History Museum.
 Eva Frommer. Fellow of the Royal College of Psychiatrists, child psychiatrist and pioneer of arts therapies in hospital, for children.
 Alfred Baring Garrod, physician who linked raised urate levels in the blood as the cause of gout 
 Clare Gerada, former Chair of the Royal College of General Practitioners (2010–13), the first female Chair for 50 years
 Alan Powell Goffe, pathologist whose research contributed to the development of the polio and measles vaccines
 Ben Goldacre, academic and science writer
 Michael Goldacre, Professor of Public Health, University of Oxford
 Wendy Greengross(1925–2012), general practitioner and broadcaster 
 Gillian Hanson, intensive care specialist
 Anita Harding, neurologist who co-authored the first paper which identified pathogenic mitochondrial DNA mutation in human disease (in Kearn-Sayre syndrome). 
 Victor Horsley, pioneering Neurosurgeon
 Allan Octavian Hume, one of the founders of the Indian National Congress
 Leander Starr Jameson, physician, politician and leader of the Jameson raid on whom Rudyard Kipling based his poem If-.
 Donald Jeffries, leading expert on HIV
 Christian Jessen, television presenter
 Nick Lane, biochemist and writer
 Thomas Lewis, cardiologist who was appointed CBE and also knighted.
 Joseph Lister pioneer of anti-septic surgery, who after receiving a bachelor's degree from UCL, trained at UCLH winning several gold medals during his time there Kalman Mann, 8th director general of Hadassah Medical Organization 
 Hugh Llewellyn Glyn Hughes, CBE, DSO & 2 bars, MC, MRCS. Brigadier Royal Army Medical Corps
 Henry Marsh, neurosurgeon who was appointed CBE.
 Arthur Martin-Leake, soldier who received both the Victoria Cross and the Bar.
 Clare Marx, first female president elected at the Royal College of Surgeons of England (2014-2017)
 Henry Maudsley, prominent psychiatrist after whom The Maudsley Hospital is named
 Ramani Moonesinghe, consultant in Anaesthetics and Critical Care Medicine and Associate National Clinical Director for Elective Care for NHS England
 Michael Mosley, television journalist and presenter
 Gladys Miall-Smith, first doctor in Welwyn Garden City
 Catherine Neill, paediatric cardiologist at Johns Hopkins Hospital
 Hugh Owen Thomas, father of orthopaedic surgery in Britain
 Max Pemberton, medical doctor and journalist
 Amanda Ramirez, professor of liaison psychiatry at King's College London
 Philip Randle, the Randle cycle is named after him
 Bernard Ribeiro, Baron Ribeiro, former President of the Royal College of Surgeons of England (2005–08). Life peer in House of Lords since 2010.
 Sydney Ringer, a British clinician, physiologist and pharmacologist, best known for inventing Ringer's solution.
 William Scoresby Routledge, ethnographer
 Rosemary Rue, physician and civil servant
 Mary Patricia Shepherd, thoracic surgeon
 Elizabeth Joan Stokes, clinical bacteriologist
 Edward Treacher Collins, ophthalmologist and first described Treacher Collins Syndrome
 Dawson Turner, rugby union international who represented England (1871–75). 
 Margaret Turner-Warwick, first female president elected at the Royal College of Physicians (1989-1992)
 Sir John Williams, 1st Baronet, of the City of London, gynaecologist and obstetrician to Queen Victoria
 Albertine Winner, physician and medical administrator
 R. A. Young, physician and expert on tuberculosis

References

Sources
 University College Hospital and Its Medical School: A History by W R Merrington (1976)

External links
 UCL Medical School official website
 Royal Free, University College and Middlesex Medical Students Society website
 UCL Medical School Clinical Assessment Centre website
 UCL Institute of Orthopaedics and Musculoskeletal Science
 How British Women Became Doctors: The Story of the Royal Free Hospital and its Medical School - Neil McIntyre/Wenrowave Press 2014

Departments of University College London
Medical schools in London
United Hospitals
Education in the London Borough of Camden